

1890s–1930s 

Australian filmmakers were at the forefront of cinema and film, having created what is considered the first feature-length narrative film with the release of The Story of the Kelly Gang and other early films by directors John Gavin, W. J. Lincoln and Alfred Rolfe.

Notable Australian films of the 1890s:
Passengers Alighting from Ferry Brighton at Manly (1896) – first film produced and screened in Australia
The Melbourne Cup (1896) – multiple reel sports documentary of the Melbourne Cup Carnival
Patineur Grotesque (1897) – comedy roller-skater routine originally filmed in 1896
Prince Ranjitsinhji Practising Batting in the Nets (1897) – featuring Ranjitsinhji one of the earliest surviving cricket films
Social Salvation (1898) – documentary about living conditions produced by Herbert Booth for the Salvation Army in Australia
Notable Australian films of the early 1900s:
Soldiers of the Cross (1900) – religious drama produced by the Limelight Department of the Salvation Army
Inauguration of the Commonwealth (1901) – multiple reel documentary of the Federation of Australia
The Story of the Kelly Gang (1906) – world's first feature-length film
Moora Neya, or The Message of the Spear (1911) – one of the first films to depict Indigenous Australians
The Sentimental Bloke (1919) – made by Raymond Longford and Lottie Lyell, one of the first, best known and most successful silent era films with a first-person narrative, the best-known partnership in Australian film at that time
For the Term of His Natural Life (1927) – based on the novel by Marcus Clarke; the most expensive Australian silent film ever made
Notable Australian films of the 1930s:
On Our Selection (1932) – comedy based on the Dad and Dave stories by Steele Rudd
In the Wake of the Bounty (1933) – first film to star Errol Flynn, an iconic Australian "swashbuckler" character
The Squatter's Daughter (1933) – directed by Ken G. Hall, one of the most popular Australian films of the 1930s

1940s–1970s 

The mid-1900s had a slow start for Australian film, although the first Academy Award was won for an Australian film, Kokoda Front Line!. The industry picked back up during the 1970s with one of the first internationally released films, Picnic at Hanging Rock, and with the success of the series of Mad Max franchise films.

Notable Australian films of the 1940s–1950s:
Forty Thousand Horsemen (1940) – one of the most successful films of its day
Kokoda Front Line! (1942) – first Australian film to win an Oscar, for Best Documentary Feature in 1942
Sons of Matthew (1949) – popular drama by Charles Chauvel
The Long Journey (1954) – Collings Productions
Australia Builds (1957) – Collings Productions
Jedda (1955) – first Australian film to have two indigenous lead actors
Conquest of The Rivers (1958) – AFI winner for Best Film
Hard to Windward (1958) – AFI winner for Best Film
Edge of The Deep (1959) – AFI winner for Best Film
The Power Makers (1959) – AFI winner for Best Film

Notable Australian films of the 1960s:
Three in a Million (1960) – AFI winner for Best Film
Bypass to Life (1962) – AFI winner for Best Film
Night Freighter (1962) – AFI winner for Best Film
The Big Boomerang (1962) – Collings Productions
Sidney Nolan (1962) – Collings Productions
The Land That Waited (1963) – AFI winner for Best Film
The Dreaming (1963) – Collings Productions
The Dancing Class (1964) – AFI winner for Best Film
I, the Aboriginal (1964) – AFI winner for Best Film
Pattern of Life (1964) – Collings Productions
The Legend of Damien Parer (1965) – AFI winner for Best Film
Stronger Since The War (1965) – AFI winner for Best Film
Clay (1965) – Cannes Festival official entry
Toehold in History (1965) – Collings Productions
They're a Weird Mob (1966) – said to have been one factor leading to the founding of the Australian film industry; based on the novel of the same title
Concerto for Orchestra (1966) – AFI winner for Best Film
The Australians: The Second Assault (1966) – Collings Productions
Australian Painters 1964-1966: The Harold Mertz Collection (1966) – Collings Productions
Cardin in Australia (1967) – AFI winner for Best Film
The Change at Groote (1968) – AFI winner for Best Film
The Talgai Skull (1968) – AFI winner for Best Film
Fiji Harvest (1968) – Collings Productions
Jack and Jill: A Postscript (1969) – AFI winner for Best Film
Skippy and the Intruders (1969) – spin-off of the Skippy the Bush Kangaroo TV series

Notable Australian films of the 1970s:
Three To Go: Michael (1970) – AFI winner for Best Film
Nickel Queen (1970) 
Homesdale (1971) – AFI winner for Best Film
Walkabout (1971) – first film appearance of David Gulpilil
Stork (1972) – AFI winner for Best Film
Wake in Fright (1971)
Marco Polo Jr. Versus the Red Dragon (1972) – Australia's first animated feature film
Libido (1973) – AFI winner for Best Film
27A (1973) – AFI winner for Best Film
The Cars That Ate Paris (1974) – directed by Peter Weir
Stone (1974) – directed by Sandy Harbutt
Sunday Too Far Away (1975) – AFI winner for Best Film, acclaimed for its realistic character portrayal
Picnic at Hanging Rock (1975) – one of the first Australian films to reach an international audience; based on the book of the same title
The Devil's Playground (1976) – AFI winner for Best Film
The Chant of Jimmie Blacksmith (1976) – multi-award-winning film
Don’s Party (1976) - won six AFI Awards, including Best Direction and Best Screenplay. Based on the 1971 play of the same name
Storm Boy (1977) – AFI winner for Best Film
The Getting of Wisdom (1977) – nominated for 5 AFI Awards and winner of Best Adapted Screenplay
Newsfront (1978) – winner of 8 AFI awards including Best Film and Best Actor: Bill Hunter.
Mouth to Mouth (1978) – AFI nominee Kim Krejus
Mad Max (1979) – held world record as the highest profit-to-cost ratio of a motion picture; introduced Mel Gibson to an international audience
My Brilliant Career (1979) – AFI winner for Best Film
Tim (1979) – winner of 3 AFI Awards, including Best Actor: Mel Gibson

1980s

The Man from Snowy River was a highly acclaimed Australian film released in the 1980s, along with Crocodile Dundee which boosted the nation's economy and tourism industry. The Year My Voice Broke is also held in high regard.

Notable Australian films of the 1980s:
Breaker Morant (1980) – nominated for an Oscar for Best Screenplay; AFI winner for Best Film
Gallipoli (1981) – AFI winner for Best Film; Gallipoli is an important historical Australian event
Mad Max 2 (1981) – AFI winner for Best Direction, Costume Design, Editing, Production Design and Sound
Lonely Hearts (1982) – AFI winner for Best Film
Running on Empty (1982) – classic Australian drag racing movie
The Man from Snowy River (1982) – award-winning, iconic film
BMX Bandits (1983) – earliest film appearance of Nicole Kidman
Careful, He Might Hear You (1983) – AFI winner for Best Film
Phar Lap (1983) – based on the successful New Zealand racehorse
The Slim Dusty Movie (1984) – based on the Australian country musician and singer Slim Dusty
Annie's Coming Out (1984) – AFI winner for Best Film
Fortress (1985) – won American Cinema Editors for direction of Photography in 1986
Bliss (1985) – AFI winner for Best Film
Burke & Wills (1985) – AFI nominations for Best Music Score and Best Cinematography
Crocodile Dundee (1986) – received international acclaim; nominated for an Oscar for Best Screenplay
Malcolm (1986) – AFI winner for Best Film; one of the first films starring Colin Friels
For Love Alone (1986) – five AFI Award nominations; nominated for a Golden Bear at the Berlin Film Festival; starring Hugo Weaving, Sam Neill, and Naomi Watts in her first film appearance
The Lighthorsemen (1987) – about an Australian Light Horse unit
The Year My Voice Broke (1987) – often cited by critics as the best Australian film in the past 25 years; AFI winner for Best Film
Dogs in Space (1987) – cult film set in the post-punk "little band scene" in Melbourne in 1979.
Ground Zero (1987) – Aboriginals and service personnel exposed to dangerous radiation levels, either carelessly or as "human guinea pigs"
Rikky and Pete (1988) – directed by Nadia Tass 
Ghosts… of the Civil Dead (1988) – directed by John Hillcoat
Sebastian and the Sparrow (1988) – directed by Scott Hicks
Evil Angels (A Cry in the Dark) (1989) – AFI winner for Best Film and Meryl Streep Best Actress Oscar Nominee
Houseboat Horror (1989) – featuring Alan Dale from Neighbours
Dead Calm (1989) – included on The New York Times Top 1000 Movies list

1990s

The 1990s saw the release of the successful Muriel's Wedding and The Adventures of Priscilla, Queen of the Desert in 1994 and The Castle in 1997. Strictly Ballroom was also a successful and influential release.

Notable Australian films of the 1990s:
Death in Brunswick (1990)
Flirting (1990) – AFI winner for Best Film
The Big Steal (1990) – AFI winner for Best Actor, Best Score, and Best Screenplay
Proof (1991) – AFI winner for Best Film; one of the first major films starring Russell Crowe and Hugo Weaving
Romper Stomper (1992) – multi-award-winning film; one of the first major films starring Russell Crowe
Strictly Ballroom (1992) – nominated for Golden Globe, with additional 16 wins and 11 further nominations; AFI winner for Best Film
The Piano (1993) – New Zealand co-production; won 3 Oscars and received a further 5 nominations; AFI winner for Best Film
Sirens (1994) – starred Hugh Grant, Tara Fitzgerald, Sam Neill and Elle Macpherson
Bad Boy Bubby (1994) – won four AFI awards: Best Director (Rolf de Heer), Best Actor in a Leading Role (Nicholas Hope), Best Original Screenplay and Best Editing
Metal Skin (1994) – FCCA award for best actor Aden Young, Ben Mendelsohn; AFI award for best achievement in sound and best achievement in production design 
Muriel's Wedding (1994) – AFI winner for Best Film; had worldwide success; the first major film for Toni Collette and Rachel Griffiths
The Adventures of Priscilla, Queen of the Desert (1994) – cult classic; now a performing musical production; the first large-scale appearance of Guy Pearce and Hugo Weaving
The Sum of Us (1994) – Russell Crowe, Jack Thompson 
Dad and Dave : On Our Selection – Leo McKern Joan Sutherland and Geoffrey Rush
Angel Baby (1995) – AFI winner for Best Film
All Men Are Liars (1995) – starred Toni Pearen, David Price, and John Jarratt
Babe (1995) – won an Oscar for Best Achievement in Visual Effects; nominated for a further six
Così – AFI winner for best screenplay; 2 other nominations; ensemble piece starring Barry Otto, Toni Colette, David Wenham and Ben Mendlesohn
Shine (1996) – AFI winner for Best Film; Geoffrey Rush won Best Actor Oscar
Idiot Box (1996) – starring Ben Mendelsohn and Jeremy Sims 
Hotel de Love (1996) – Aden Young, Saffron Burrows
Love and Other Catastrophes (1996) – nominated for 5 AFI awards
Dating the Enemy (1996) – starring Guy Pearce and Claudia Karvan
 Romeo + Juliet (1996) – a modern version of the Shakespeare tragedy, directed by Baz Luhrmann
 Love Serenade (1996) – director/writer Shirley Barret with actors Miranda Otto and Rebecca Frith
Kiss or Kill (1997) – AFI winner for Best Film
Doing Time for Patsy Cline (1997) – 10 AFI nominations; winner of 4, including Best Actor
The Castle (1997) – low-budget box-office success, received national acclaim
Year of the Dogs (1997) – documentary film; AFI winner of Best Editing in a Non-Feature Film
Road to Nhill (1997) – won the Golden Alexander award at the International Thessaloniki film festival
The Wiggles Movie (1997)
Blackrock (1997) – nominated for 5 AFI awards; the movie debut of Heath Ledger
Oscar and Lucinda (1997) – nominated for an Oscar for Best Costume Design; nominated for 7 AFI Awards and winner of 5; starring Ralph Fiennes and Cate Blanchett
Crackers (1998)
Dead Letter Office (1998) – Miranda Otto
Radiance (1998) – nominated for 6 AFI Awards; winner for Best Actress: Deborah Mailman
The Boys (1998) – nominated for 13 AFI awards; winner of 5, including Best Director
The Interview (1998) – AFI winner for Best Film
Paperback Hero (1998) – Hugh Jackman, Claudia Karvan
Two Hands (1999) – AFI winner for Best Film
Soft Fruit (1999) – written and directed by Christina Andreef

2000s

The 2000s in the history of Australian film have seen mixed success, including Moulin Rouge! revitalizing the musical film genre, award-winning short film Harvie Krumpet, and box office success Happy Feet.

Notable Australian films of the 2000s:
The Dish (2000) – internationally successful film which presents a somewhat fictionalised account of the Parkes Observatory's role in the Apollo 11 moon landing
Bootmen (2000) – multi-award-winning film, one of the first films starring Sam Worthington and Adam Garcia
Better Than Sex (2000) – David Wenham, Susie Porter
The Magic Pudding (2000) – Sam Neill, Geoffrey Rush, Hugo Weaving, Jack Thompson, Toni Collette and John Cleese
He Died with a Felafel in His Hand (2001) – Noah Taylor
Chopper (2000) – multi-award-winning, influential film based on the character of Mark Brandon "Chopper" Read
On the Beach (2000) – two AFI nominations (Armand Assante, Rachel Ward, Bryan Brown, Jaqueline McKenzie, Grant Bowler, Steve Bastoni)
The Wog Boy (2000) – Nick Giannopoulos, Vince Colosimo, Lucy Bell
Looking for Alibrandi (2000) – AFI winner for Best Film
The Bank (2000) – high-tech thriller capitalising on strong anti-bank sentiment
Silent Partner (2001) – low-budget, almost no-budget film that offers an excellent and sensitive study about mateship between two losers
Lantana (2001) – AFI winner for Best Film
Moulin Rouge! (2001) – widely credited with revitalising the musical genre of film; won 7 major awards and 10 nominations
Crocodile Dundee in Los Angeles (2001)
The Man Who Sued God (2001) – AFI nomination for Best Original Screenplay (Don Watson); starring Billy Connolly, Judy Davis and Colin Friels
One Night the Moon (2001) – AFI winner and New York International Independent Film & Video Festival Genre award winner; a musical (winner, Screen Music Awards, Australia) based on the true story of a young girl who went missing in the Australian outback in 1932
WillFull (2001) – willful ghost of a parent returns
The Tracker (2002) – AFI winner for Best Actor: David Gulpilil
Rabbit-Proof Fence (2002) – AFI winner for Best Film; based on the book Follow the Rabbit-Proof Fence; stirred debate over its historical accuracy
Crackerjack (2002) – Mick Molloy, Bill Hunter 
The Nugget (2002) 
Dirty Deeds (2002) – 3 wins and 9 nominations
The Master of Disguise (2002)
The Hard Word (2002) – 5 wins and 8 nominations
Swimming Upstream (2002) – Geoffrey Rush, Judy Davis, Jesse Spencer, Tim Draxl
Trojan Warrior (2002) – Stan Longanidis, Arthur Angel, John Brumpton
Cracker Bag (2003) – Cannes Palme d'Or winner; AFI winner for both Best Short Fiction Film; Best Screenplay in a Short Fiction Film
Danny Deckchair (2003) – Rhys Ifans, Miranda Otto
Harvie Krumpet (2003) – won Oscar for Best Short Film (Animated)
Gettin' Square (2003) – AFI winner for Best Film; AFI winner for Best Actor: David Wenham
Take Away (2003)
Japanese Story (2003) – AFI winner for Best Film
Undead (2003)
Love's Brother (2004)
Strange Bedfellows (2004)
Peaches (2004) – Hugo Weaving, Jacqueline McKenzie, Emma Lung, Matthew Le Nevez
Somersault (2004) – AFI winner for Best Film
One Perfect Day (2004) – FCCA winner Best Music Score, IF winner Best Sound, ASDA winner Best Director of a First Feature, eight AFI Nominations
Wolf Creek (2005) – seven AFI Nominations, including Best Director (John Jarratt, Nathan Philips)
Look Both Ways (2005) – AFI winner for Best Film
The Proposition (2005)
Ra Choi (2005)
The Illustrated Family Doctor (2005) – Samuel Johnson, Colin Friels, Jessica Napier, Sacha Horler
Three Dollars (2005) – based on the novel by Elliot Perlman; starring David Wenham and Frances O'Connor
Monster-in-Law (2005)
Little Fish (2005) – Cate Blanchett, Hugo Weaving and Noni Hazlehurst all won AFI awards for this film set in Sydney
Opal Dream (2006) – Vince Colosimo, Jacqueline McKenzie, Christian Byers, Sapphire Boyce
BoyTown (2006) – Glenn Robbins, Mick Molloy, Bob Franklin, Wayne Hope, Gary Eck
Kenny (2006) – AFI winner for Best Actor
Ten Canoes (2006) – first film made with entirely native Australian Aboriginal spoken languages; AFI winner for Best Film
Candy (2006) – Abbie Cornish, Heath Ledger and Geoffrey Rush in a film about love and how drugs affect one's life
Jindabyne (2006) – set in Jindabyne, starring Laura Linney and Gabriel Byrne
Happy Feet (2006) – first Australian film to win an Oscar for Best Animated Feature Film
Who Killed Dr Bogle and Mrs Chandler? (2006) – an answer to Australia's largest murder mystery and winner of Most Outstanding Documentary in the 2007 Logies
Last Train to Freo (2006)
Kokoda (2006)
Romulus, My Father (2007) – Australian Film Institute Award for Best Film winner, starring Eric Bana
Lucky Miles (2007)
The Final Winter (2007)
The Jammed (2007) – winner, Best Film, Best Music, Best Script IF Awards; 7 AFI nominations; considered by some leading critics to be the best Australian film of 2007; achieved the highest screen average opening week for any independent Australian film in history
Clubland (2007)
Noise (2007)
Rogue (2007) 
Black Water (2007)
December Boys (2007) – based on the book; starring Daniel Radcliffe
Newcastle (2008) – surfing drama film set in the New South Wales city of Newcastle
Marry Me (2008) – winner Best Actress (Jahla Bryant) and top prize at 2008 Tropfest.
The Square (2008) – nominated for 7 AFI awards including Best Picture, Best Director and Best Actor; winner, 2008 IF Awards – Best Sound
The Black Balloon (2008) – featuring Toni Collette, Gemma Ward
Unfinished Sky (2008)
Among Dead Men (2008) – winner, 2008 Action on Film Festival's Best Fight Choreography
Australia (2008) – Baz Luhrmann film starring Nicole Kidman and Hugh Jackman
Solo (2008) – documentary directed by David Michôd and Jennifer Peedom
Balibo (2009)
Samson and Delilah (2009) – Cannes Camera D'or winner
Beautiful Kate (2009)
Last Ride (2009)
Mary and Max (2009)
Charlie & Boots (2009)
Stone Bros. (2009)
Cedar Boys (2009) – nominated for Best Film at the 2009 Kodak Inside Film Awards in Sydney
Offside (2009)
Van Diemen's Land (2009)
The Book of Revelation (2006)

2010s

Bran Nue Dae (2010)
Animal Kingdom (2010)
Oranges and Sunshine (2010)
Uninhabited (2010)
Tomorrow, When the War Began (2010)
Daybreakers (2010) – starring Ethan Hawke, Sam Neill, Willem Dafoe, Isabel Lucas and Vince Colosimo
I Love You Too (2010) – written by Peter Helliar, starring Peter Helliar, Yvonne Strahovski, Peter Dinklage and Brendan Cowell
Beneath Hill 60 (2010)
Red Hill (2010)
Griff the Invisible (2010)
Wog Boy 2: Kings of Mykonos (2010)
The Reef (2010)
Wasted on the Young (2010)
Sanctum (2011) – employed Executive Producer James Cameron for 3D effects; one of the most successful Australian films at the box office
A Heartbeat Away (2011)
Wrath (2011)
Mad Bastards (2011)
The Eye of The Storm (2011)
The Cup (2011)
Snowtown (2011)
The Hunter (2011)
Red Dog (2011)
Little Johnny: The Movie (2011)
Dingoes & Dubstep in the Red Center (2011)
Not Suitable for Children (2012) – directed by Peter Templeman
The Sapphires (2012)
Any Questions for Ben? (2012)
100 Bloody Acres (2012)
Mental (2012)
Wish You Were Here (2012)
Reverse Runner (2012)
Bait 3D (2012) – starring Lincoln Lewis
Black & White & Sex (2012)
Satellite Boy (2013) – starring David Gulpilil
Six Lovers (2012) – written and directed by Laurent Boulanger 
 The Rocket (2013)
 Mystery Road (2013)
 Felony (2013)
 The Great Gatsby (2013) – Australian/American adaptation of the American novel of the same name; directed by Baz Luhrmann, the film was an international box office success
Wolf Creek 2 (2013) – Greg McLean directed and John Jarratt reprised his role from the previous film
 The Turning (2013)
Tracks (2013)
These Final Hours (2013) – apocalyptic thriller film written and directed by Zak Hilditch
The Rover (2014)
Predestination (2014)
Dinosaur Island (2014) – written and directed by Matt Drummond
The Babadook (2014)
Healing (2014)
Plague (2014) – post-apocalyptic film by Kosta Ouzas & Nick Kozakis
Wyrmwood (2014)
Maya the Bee Movie (2014) – starring Jacki Weaver, Richard Roxburgh, Noah Taylor, Miriam Margolyes, Justine Clarke, Coco Jack Gillies and Kodi Smit-McPhee
 Son of a Gun (2014)
Still Flowin': The Movie (2014) – written and directed by R.A.E.D
Mad Max: Fury Road (2015) – won six Academy Awards, the most ever for an Australian film
Drown (2015)
Paper Planes (2015)
A Month of Sundays (2015)
Girl Asleep (2015)
Holding the Man (2015)
Aussies in the Andes (2015) – documentary
Blinky Bill the Movie (2015) – starring Ryan Kwanten, Rufus Sewell, Toni Collette, Robin McLeavy, David Wenham, Richard Roxburgh, Deborah Mailman, Barry Otto and Barry Humphries 
Oddball (2015) – family directed by Stuart McDonald starring Shane Jacobson, Sarah Snook, Alan Tudyk, Deborah Mailman and Coco Jack Gillies
The Dressmaker (2015) – revenge comedy-drama directed by Jocelyn Moorhouse; starring Kate Winslet, Judy Davis, Liam Hemsworth, Hugo Weaving
Sherpa (2015) – documentary directed by Jennifer Peedom
Colonel Panics (2016)
Remembering The Man (2016)
Burns Point (2016) – directed by Tim Blackburn
Spin Out (2016)
The Legend of Ben Hall (2016)
Top Knot Detective (2016) – directed by Aaron McCann and Dominic Pearce
Red Dog: True Blue (2016) – a prequel to 'Red Dog' directed by Kriv Stenders; starring Jason Isaacs, Levi Miller and Bryan Brown
Goldstone (2016) – a sequel to 'Mystery Road'
Lion (2016) – directed by Garth Davis; starring Dev Patel, Nicole Kidman, Rooney Mara and David Wenham
The Novelist (2017) – written and directed by Laurent Boulanger
La Souffrance (2017) 
Australia 2 (2017) – Sport/Adventure
Mountain (2017) – documentary directed by Jennifer Peedom
Breath (2017) – written and directed by Simon Baker
Sweet Country (2017 film) directed by Warwick Thornton
The Film From Lot 15 (2018) – written and directed by Max Coultan
Maya the Bee: The Honey Games (2018)
Storm Boy (2018) – directed by Shawn Seet, starring Geoffrey Rush, Jai Courtney, Finn Little, Trevor Jamieson, Morgana Davies and Erik Thomson
Melodrama/Random/Melbourne (2018) – Asian Australian film directed by Matthew Victor Pastor
Ladies in Black (2018) – based on the book The Women in Black
Hidden Light (2018) – directed by Aaron Kamp
Eleven Days (2018 – directed by Jaginder Singh
Nekrotronic (2019) – directed by Kiah Roache-Turner
Palm Beach (2019) – directed by Rachel Ward, starring Frances Berry, Bryan Brown, Matilda Brown, Richard E. Grant
The Nightingale (2018) – directed by Jennifer Kent
Danger Close: The Battle of Long Tan (2019) – directed by Kriv Stenders, starring Travis Fimmel
Ride Like a Girl (2019) – directed by Rachel Griffiths, starring Teresa Palmer and Sam Neill
Koko: A Red Dog Story (2019) – directed by Aaron McCann and Dominic Pearce, narrated by Jason Issacs
The Wishmas Tree (2019)
H Is for Happiness (2019) – starring Daisy Axon, Wesley Patten, Richard Roxburgh, Emma Booth, Joel Jackson, Deborah Mailman and Miriam Margolyes
Dirt Music (2019)

2020s

True History of the Kelly Gang (2020) – directed by Justin Kurzel, starring George MacKay, Essie Davis, Nicholas Hoult, Orlando Schwerdt, Thomasin McKenzie, Sean Keenan, Charlie Hunnam, and Russell Crowe
Go Karts (2020) – directed by	Owen Trevor, starring Richard Roxburgh and Frances O'Connor
Rams (2020) – directed by Jeremy Sims, starring Sam Neill and Michael Caton
100% Wolf (2020) – directed by	Alexs Stadermann, starring Jai Courtney, Samara Weaving, Magda Szubanski, Rhys Darby, Akmal Saleh, Ilai Swindells, Rupert Degas and Jane Lynch
Slim & I (2020) – documentary directed by Kriv Stenders
Babyteeth (2020)
Never Too Late (2020) – directed by Mark Lamprell, starring James Cromwell, Shane Jacobson and Jacki Weaver
Combat Wombat (2020) – starring Deborah Mailman
High Ground (2020)
The Furnace (2020)
 Back to the Outback (2021)
The Dry (2021) – starring Eric Bana
Penguin Bloom (2021) – starring Naomi Watts
Maya the Bee: The Golden Orb (2021)
Long Story Short (2021)
Daisy Quokka: World's Scariest Animal (2021)
Ammonite (2021) – directed by Francis Lee, starring Kate Winslet
June Again (2021) – starring Noni Hazlehurst

See also

 :Category:Films set in Australia
 :Category:Films shot in Australia
 List of films set in Australia
 List of Australian history films
 List of years in Australia
 List of years in Australian television

References

External links

National bodies
Screen Australia
National Film and Sound Archive of Australia (NFSA)

Australian Film, Television and Radio School (AFTRS)

Australian Film Finance Corporation (FFC)

Australian Film Institute (AFI) 
Australian Screen Directors Association (ASDA)

State bodies
Pacific Film & Television Commission
Film Victoria
South Australian Film Corporation (SAFC)

Darwin Film Society

ACT Filmmakers' Network

Directories
Film Org Au

Festivals
Flickerfest Short Film Festival
Melbourne Queer Film & Video Festival
Tropicana/Tropfest Short Film Festival
IF (Inside Film magazine) Awards

Festival of Perth Film Season

Newtown Flicks Short Film Festival

Collections and Resources
australianscreen Australia's audiovisual heritage online
ACMI Collections
AFI Library
Cinephilia

Australian WWW Film & Television Production Service

Other various
Australian Centre for the Moving Image (ACMI)